Noel Jesús León Vázquez (born 21 December 2004), better known as Noel León, is a Mexican racing driver who most recently competed in the Formula Regional European Championship with Arden Motorsport. He is the 2019–20 NACAM F4 and 2021 F4 US champion.

Career

Lower formulae

2020 

Contesting the entire 2019–20 NACAM F4 season and once again competing with Ram Racing, the season would prove to be a breakthrough, as León scored seven victories, which, coupled with eight further podiums, propelled him to title success.

2021 

In 2021, León progressed into the F4 United States Championship with DEForce Racing, partnering fellow countryman José Andrés Martínez. Whilst he only scored two wins at Road America and Mid-Ohio across the year, the Mexican managed to move his way to the lead of the standings with a string of consistent podium finishes, culminating in a double podium at the Circuit of the Americas in a round supporting the 2021 United States Grand Prix, where León clinched the championship.

Formula Regional European Championship 
León made his first step into European single-seaters in 2022, racing in the Formula Regional European Championship with Arden Motorsport. He wouldn't score points at the opening two rounds in Monza and Imola, however this would change at Monaco, where he managed to obtain tenth place in the first race and ninth place in the second, scoring his first points.

FIA Formula 3 Championship 
León partook in the FIA Formula 3 post-season testing at the end of September with Van Amersfoort Racing during the first day.

Euroformula Open 
For the 2023 season, León moved to the Euroformula Open Championship, driving for Team Motopark.

Formula One 
On 14 January 2022 Red Bull announced that León would be joining the Red Bull Junior Team in the form of a supported driver. His contract only lasted a year and he was dropped by the team at the start of 2023.

Karting record

Karting career summary

Racing record

Racing career summary 

* Season still in progress.

Complete NACAM Formula 4 Championship results 
(key) (Races in bold indicate pole position) (Races in italics indicate fastest lap)

Complete Formula 4 United States Championship results 
(key) (Races in bold indicate pole position) (Races in italics indicate fastest lap)

Complete Formula Regional European Championship results 
(key) (Races in bold indicate pole position) (Races in italics indicate fastest lap)

Complete Euroformula Open Championship results 
(key) (Races in bold indicate pole position) (Races in italics indicate fastest lap)

* Season still in progress.

References

External links 
 

2004 births
Living people
Mexican racing drivers
Formula Regional European Championship drivers
Arden International drivers
Karting World Championship drivers
United States F4 Championship drivers
NACAM F4 Championship drivers
Euroformula Open Championship drivers
Motopark Academy drivers
Sportspeople from Monterrey